Joseph Maestas (born 1960/1961) is an American politician and engineer who is a member of the New Mexico Public Regulation Commission. Elected in 2020, he assumed office on January 1, 2021, succeeding Valerie Espinoza. He announced on July 19, 2021 he is a candidate for New Mexico State Auditor.

Early life and education 
Maestas was born in Santa Fe, New Mexico and raised on a farm in Santa Cruz, New Mexico. He earned a Bachelor of Science from the University of New Mexico and a Master of Science from Arizona State University, Tempe, both in civil engineering.

Career 
For over 30 years, Maestas has worked as an engineer and government regulator. In 2014, he was elected to serve as a member of the Santa Fe City Council for the second district. From 2006 to 2010, he was the mayor of Española, New Mexico. Maestas was also a candidate for mayor of Santa Fe in 2018, losing to Alan Webber.

In the 2020 election, Maestas was a candidate for the third district on the New Mexico Public Regulation Commission. He defeated Brian Harris in the Democratic primary and Libertarian nominee Chris Luchini in the November general election. He assumed office on January 1, 2021.

References 

 

 

21st-century American politicians
American civil engineers
Engineers from New Mexico
Living people
Mayors of places in New Mexico
New Mexico city council members
New Mexico Democrats
People from Española, New Mexico
People from Santa Fe, New Mexico
Politicians from Santa Fe, New Mexico
State auditors of New Mexico
University of New Mexico alumni
Year of birth missing (living people)